Me Logia Ellinika (Greek: Με Λόγια Ελληνικά) is the first all-Greek album by Greek musical group Antique.  The album was released in December 2003 by V2 Records. The album contains 6 new songs in Greek and 4 new dance remixes. The first single, "Follow Me", was released with a music video and was one of the year's hits. Also included are "Adiko Kai Krima" featuring Katy Garbi and the music videos of "Follow Me" and "(I Would) Die for You".

Track listing

References

Antique (band) albums
Greek-language albums
2001 albums
V2 Records albums